Castor Nunatak is a nunatak  southwest of Oceana Nunatak in the Seal Nunataks group, off the east coast of the Antarctic Peninsula. It was first seen and mapped as an island in December 1893 by a Norwegian Sealing expedition under C.A. Larsen, who named it after the Castor, a ship which combined sealing and exploring activities along the west coast of the Antarctic Peninsula under Captain Morten Pedersen in 1893–94. The feature was determined to be a nunatak in 1902 by the Swedish Antarctic Expedition under Otto Nordenskiöld.

References 

Nunataks of Graham Land
Oscar II Coast